Vericor Power Systems is a manufacturer of aeroderivative marine and industrial gas turbines based in Alpharetta, Georgia, United States. Vericor is a wholly owned subsidiary of German-based MTU Aero Engines.

History
Vericor's history began in the late 1960s with Avco Lycoming. Lycoming developed its Lycoming T55 aircraft turboshaft into the TF-40 marine gas turbine for the United States Navy's Landing Craft Air Cushion (LCAC) assault transport hovercraft.

In 1994, the Lycoming Turbine Engine Division was acquired by AlliedSignal, becoming part of AlliedSignal Aerospace, and Honeywell Aerospace in 1999.

In 1999, AlliedSignal/Honeywell formed a joint venture with MTU Aero Engines called Vericor Power Systems LLC to manage its marine and industrial gas turbine products. In June 2002, MTU acquired full ownership of Vericor, which became a wholly owned subsidiary.

Products
Marine Propulsion
 Vericor TF40 
 Vericor ETF40B 
 Vericor TF50

Power generation
 VPS3M (TF40) 
 VPS4M (TF50) 
 VPS1 (ASE8) 
 VPS3 (ASE40) 
 VPS4 (ASE50)

Oil and gas mechanical drive
 VPS1 (ASE8) 
 VPS3 (ASE40) 
 VPS4 (ASE50)

References

External links
 Vericor website

Marine engine manufacturers
Gas turbines
Engine manufacturers of the United States